Edward Chauncy Ellis (10 January 1810 – 28 March 1887) was an English cricketer who was associated with Cambridge University Cricket Club and made his first-class debut in 1829.

Ellis was born in Leyton, Essex. He was a student at Trinity College, Cambridge, from 1828 and won a blue for cricket in 1829; later he was ordained in the Church of England and after curacies in Essex became the rector of Langham, Essex (in the diocese of St Albans) in 1847 and stayed there until his death there in 1887.

He was the youngest brother of Thomas Flower Ellis and the father of Caroline Ellis, the mother of philosopher John McTaggart Ellis McTaggart.

References

Bibliography
 

1810 births
1887 deaths
English cricketers
English cricketers of 1826 to 1863
Cambridge University cricketers
Gentlemen cricketers
People from Leyton
People from Langham, Essex
Alumni of Trinity College, Cambridge
19th-century English Anglican priests